Hugh Jackman: in Concert is a music concert by Australian actor, musician, and dancer Hugh Jackman.

Jackman performed Broadway and Hollywood musical numbers, backed by a 17-piece orchestra and directed by Warren Carlyle.

Setlist
 OH, WHAT A BEAUTIFUL MORNIN’
 ONE NIGHT ONLY
 I WON’T DANCE
 CRAZY LITTLE THING CALLED LOVE / A LITTLE LESS CONVERSATION
 L.O.V.E.
 THE WAY YOU LOOK TONIGHT 
 SOLILOQUY
 FEVER
 ROCK ISLAND
 TAKE ME OR LEAVE ME [MERLE & ANGEL]
 THE BOY NEXT DOOR
 PETER ALLEN MEDLEY
 TENTERFIELD SADDLER
 MOVIE MEDLEY
 SOMEWHERE OVER THE RAINBOW
 MACK THE KNIFE
 ONCE BEFORE I GO

Reviews
“... at every turn, Jackman seems to make it abundantly clear that in this moment — whether he’s riffing on the golden days of the movie musical, or feeling his way through a deeply memorable rendition of Carousel’s ‘Soliloquy,’ or reprising lesser-known Allen songs such as ‘Tenterfield Saddler’ or ‘Once Before I Go’ — there is nowhere else he would rather be. And no one else for whom he would rather be doing it. In the face of such open-hearted generosity, there’s probably not a single person in his audience who doesn’t know exactly how he feels.”
— CANOE

“Hugh Jackman in Concert doesn’t feel like a career move – it feels like fun, the work of a talented performer unexpectedly given the chance to do what he loves just for the hell of it. But where another star might have let that opportunity sour into a statement of ego, Jackman lets the audience share in his passion and his fun. It’s hard to imagine him ever having a better role.”
— THE GLOBE AND MAIL

References

2011 concerts
Hugh Jackman